Jonathan Preston Haynes is an American murderer known for racially motivated murders.

His parents, banker Edward Haynes and Custis Haynes, considered themselves to be liberal and open to people of any religion or race. The family closely followed the civil rights movement of the 1960s and 1970s.

As a child, Haynes was never popular, preferring books over people. He secretly read Adolf Hitler's Mein Kampf in high school, when what his father described as "his troubles" began.

In 1994, Haynes was found guilty of the murders of a Wilmette, Illinois plastic surgeon and a hairdresser. He represented himself in his trial and said he had to kill the doctor to protect the integrity of Aryan beauty.

Haynes was sentenced to death for his crimes; however his sentence was commuted to life in prison after Illinois governor George Ryan commuted all death sentences to life without parole in 2003.

References

Living people
1958 births
American people convicted of murder
American prisoners sentenced to death
American white supremacists
People convicted of murder by Illinois
Prisoners sentenced to death by Illinois

Recipients of American gubernatorial clemency